Logan Glacier may refer to the following glaciers in United States:

 Logan Glacier (Alaska), in the U.S. state of Alaska and the territory of Yukon, Canada
 Logan Glacier (Montana), in Glacier National Park, Montana